Co-operative Bank or Cooperative Bank may refer to:

 The Co-operative Bank, a bank in the United Kingdom
 Coop Bank, a bank operated by Coop amba in Denmark.
 The Co-operative Bank (New Zealand), New Zealand bank, formerly known as PSIS
 Co-operative Bank Ltd, Myanmar bank
 Cooperative Bank of Kenya, Kenyan bank
 Cooperative Bank of Misamis Oriental, Philippine bank
 Cooperative Bank of Tarlac, Philippine bank
 Cooperative Desjardins Bank, Cooperative financial group, Québec
 Cooperative banks in Germany, see Bundesverband der Deutschen Volksbanken und Raiffeisenbanken
 Coop Bank (Switzerland), founded by the Coop and now owned by the Basler Kantonalbank
 OP Financial Group, in which “OP” stands for “osuuspankki”, meaning “cooperative bank” in Finnish

Other uses
 Co-operative Permanent Building Society, earlier name of Nationwide Building Society in the UK
 The Co-operative Credit Union, a savings and loans co-operative in the UK

See also

 Credit union
 Cooperative banking
 The Co-operative Banking Group, UK banking and insurance group
 
 
 Cooperative (disambiguation)